

Play-by-play

Dave Armstrong (1993)
Dave Barnett (1992, 2001)
Gary Bender (1987–1992)
Jason Benetti (2019)
Tim Brant (1994, 1998)
Tim Brando (1993)
Jim Brinson (1992–1997)
Bob Carpenter (1995, 2000–2004)
Bill Doleman (1999)
Ron Franklin (2000–2007)
Terry Gannon (2000–2009)
Mike Goldberg (1999)
Rich Hollenberg (2020)
Keith Jackson (1987–1991)
Mark Jones (1992–2006)
Wayne Larrivee (1995)
Chris Marlowe (1995, 2003)
Al Michaels (1987–1989)
Brent Musburger (1990–2009)
Brad Nessler (2000–2002, 2005, 2007–2014)
Dave O'Brien (2003–2004, 2007)
Dave Pasch (2005–2006, 2019)
Mike Patrick (2009)
Steve Physioc (1996)
Robin Roberts (1996)
Jon Sciambi (2019)
Dan Shulman (2002–2006)
Dave Strader (2000–2002)
Jim Szoke (1999)
Gary Thorne (2005)
Mike Tirico (2000–2001)
Barry Tompkins (1992–1993)
Al Trautwig (1987–1989)
Roger Twibell (1989–1999)
Fred White (1992–1993)
Bob Wischusen (2008)

Color commentatory

Stephen Bardo (2007)
Dan Belluomini (1992, 1997–1999)
Jay Bilas (2000–2003, 2019)
Quinn Buckner (2000–2002)
Larry Conley (2000–2003)
Brad Daugherty (2001–2004)
Jimmy Dykes (1998–2014)
Len Elmore (2000–2005, 2009)
Larry Farmer (1994–1997)
Fran Fraschilla (2003–2008, 2020)
Terry Gannon (1993–1999)
Doug Gottlieb (2005)
Joe B. Hall (1987–1990)
Steve Lavin (2004–2009)
Tim McCormick (2004)
John Mengelt (1993–1999)
Ann Meyers (2002–2005)
Cheryl Miller (1989–1993)
Bob Ortegel (1992)
David Robinson (1988)
Digger Phelps (1987, 2019)
Chris Piper (1995)
Paul Splittorff (1993)
Jon Sundvold (2000–2004)
Gary Thompson (1992)
Bob Valvano (2005)
Jim Valvano (1990–1993)
Dick Vitale (1987–2005, 2019)
Bill Walton (2019)
Bob Wenzel (2008)

Studio hosts
Karl Ravech
John Saunders
Terry Gannon
Bonnie Bernstein

Studio analysts
Tom Brennan
Doug Gottlieb

Reporters
Thea Andrews
Jack Arute

References

See also
ESPN College Basketball broadcast teams
List of ESPN College Basketball personalities

College Basketball on ABC personalities
ABC personalities
ABC personalities